Prodromos is the highest village in Cyprus at  above sea level. It is the island's main centre for winter sport, with three ski slopes located on nearby Mount Olympus. The village is part of the Limassol District. The number of inhabitants has decreased steadily over the years; by  there were only 123 permanent residents, although there are over 240 residences that are temporarily occupied, mostly during the summer and other holidays.

Topography 
Built at an altitude of 1,390 meters on the mountainside and covered in the dense mountainous vegetation of Troodos, Prodromos of the about 80 residents is a village that wins its visitors’ hearts throughout the year, because of the snow that covers everything in the winter and due to the coolness which prevails there during summer.

Etymology
Prodromos is named after John the Baptist, who is commonly referred to in Greek Orthodox tradition as 'Prodromos' ('Forerunner' to Christ).

Camping 
The snow often exceeds one meter and covers the village for several weeks, and sometimes the temperature falls below zero, making the village a favorite destination for winter tourism, since at a short distance there is the Troodos ski center. With the coming of spring, many are those who enjoy hiking in the mountains, on the Nature Trails and stop at Prodromos for a relaxing lunch or coffee in its taverns and cafes. In summer those who have houses there, rent them to those who want to spend the summer in the mountains, enjoying nature, while for those who prefer camping, there is a camping site called “Kambi tou Kalogerou”.

Climate
Prodromos experiences a Mediterranean climate (Köppen: Csa) with warm to hot, dry summers and cool to cold, very wet winters.

References

External links
 Prodromos Municipality website

Communities in Limassol District